Rainer Bloss (also Rainer Blos or Rainer Bloß; 1946 – 10 December 2015) was a German electronic musician.  He collaborated with electronic composer Klaus Schulze in the 1980s to produce several albums, including Audentity (1981), Aphrica (1984), and Drive Inn (1984).

Discography

References

External links
 
 Rainer Bloss at Last.fm

1946 births
2015 deaths
German electronic musicians